is a pharmaceutical drug marketed in Japan, sold as a treatment of the digestive tract (especially as an antidiarrhoeal), whose main active ingredient is "wood creosote" (also wood-tar creosote, or beechwood creosote).

The name is nominally a registered trademark of  based in Suita, Osaka which is still the major market-share holder, but the enforceability of the tradename has been voided by the Supreme Court of Japan, which ruled seirogan to be a common generic name. The ruling only recognizes proprietary use of the bugle logo by Taiko, but not protection of its characteristic packaging. As a result, dozens of extremely similar packaged drugs are being manufactured and sold in the market.

Overview 
Seirogan is a general-use medicine, mainly to treat the gastro-intestinal system. It contains wood-tar creosote (木クレオソート) as its main active ingredient. That ingredient in the West may otherwise go by such names as "wood creosote", "beechwood creosote", or "liquid pitch oil", and should be distinguished from industrial "coal-tar creosote".

Some quarters (perhaps kanpō medicine practitioners and others) insist however that "Seirogan is not strictly speaking kanpō medicine", and this point was emphatically printed in a retraction by a certain consumer-watch type book that criticized seirogan but had confused wood creosote with the industrial type (See § Accusation controversy).

In the classic form, it is a dark brown round pill, but in order to mask its distinctive medicinal odor and bitterness, sugar-coated tablet forms have become available as well.

Trademark
The Seirogan (正露丸) name was filed for trademark registration by Taiko Pharmaceutical in 1954, but approximately thirty competitors such as  objected, leading to a lengthy battle, petitioning the Patent Office, then later litigating in court. The Tokyo District Court rejected Taiko's claim to proprietary use of the Seirogan name, and the Supreme Court of Japan upheld that decision in 1974. The Supreme Court delivered the opinion that the name seirogan had passed into a common noun, so that use of the Seirogan (正露丸) name by any company was valid, not answerable to the claims of this trademark, and did not constitute an infringement of any intellectually property rights thereof. The court also did not recognize Taiko Pharmaceutical's exclusive right to use the distinctive color scheme and graphic design on the packaged box (and sticker label on the pill bottle), with the exception of the product logo depicting a bugle (cf. §Taiko's trademark registration and Izumi's lawsuit to revoke trademark).

As a consequence, there are currently numerous Seirogan products in the market that feature logos other than the bugle but otherwise look remarkably similar: Izumi Yakuhin Kogyou (calabash logo),  (triangle and bear logo, nicknamed Yūtan). The retailer/drug store chain  and wholesaler  also market their own brands.

In 2005, Taiko filed a lawsuit against a competitor, demanding suppression of what it considered copycat merchandise, but again lost the case in court, and the Supreme Court rejected the appeal in 2008 (cf. §Taiko's petition for an injunction against unfair competitive practices).

The tune used currently by the Japan Self-Defense Forces is of a different melody.

Medical aspects

Uses and effects 
Seirogan is touted to be effective in the following: 
 Treating and allaying stomach aches, diarrhea, diarrhea due to digestive disorders, food poisoning, vomiting, water contamination (Montezuma's revenge), runny bowels warning of diarrhea, soft stool.
 Regulating stomach and intestines condition.
 Pulpitis-caused tooth cavity aches.
In pre-World War II Japan, Seirogan was believed to combat tuberculosis or aid someone with a weak constitution, and employed as a panacea (cure-all) of sorts.

Chemical composition 
(1 day dose for adults)

Taiko Pharmaceutical's Seirogan
(main ingredients)
 pharmacopoeial wood-tar creosote: 400 mg
 pharmacopoeial gambir leaves and young sprig powder: 200 mg
 pharmacopoeial Amur corktree bark powder: 300 mg
 pharmacopoeial Chinese liquorice root powder: 150 mg
() powder: 100 mg
(additives)
cinnamon
CMC-Ca
glycerine

Izumi Yakuhin Kogyou's Izumi Seirogan
(main ingredients)
pharmacopoeial wood-tar creosote: 275 mg
pharmacopoeial Japanese belladonna extract: 19.8 mg
pharmacopoeial cinnamon powder: 49.5 mg
pharmacopoeial Amur corktree bark (ōbaku) powder: 99 mg
pharmacopoeial Chinese liquorice root (kanzō) powder: 165 mg
chenpi powder: 105 mg
(additives)
baking soda
glycerine
wheat starch

Matsumoto Pharmaceutical Manufacture Co., Ltd.'s Matsuba Seirogan
(main ingredients)
 pharmacopoeial wood-tar creosote: 400 mg
pharmacopoeial Amur corktree bark (ōbaku): 150 mg
pharmacopoeial Chinese liquorice root (kanzō) powder: 250 mg
cinnamon: 100mg
pharmacopoeial gentian root powder: 100 mg
pharmacopoeial chenpi powder: 100 mg
(additives)
glycerine
rice starch

History 

There are several contending theories regarding the origins of the drug, and several names crop up as its inventor.

The Japanese Imperial Army, which experienced considerable setbacks due to unclean water sources during the Sino-Japanese War at the end of the 19th century, was working on solutions to combat infectious diseases. Surgeon-major , an instructor at the Military Medical College, discovered in 1903 that creosote agent was an effective suppressant for the typhoid fever pathogen. Taiko Pharmaceutical claims the Osaka-based medicine merchant  developed the  a year earlier in 1902 and initiated sales, which business was eventually handed over to Taiko.

The higher echelons of the Army Medical Corps, including writer Mori Ōgai, favored the German view that beriberi, a disease that caused an even heavier death toll than typhoid, was caused by an undiscovered transmittable pathogens (in contrast, British-trained doctors in the navy correctly saw it as a nutritional disorder). Prompted by their misguided view, the army distributed vast quantities of Seirogan (with their proven antiseptic properties) among the troops to be administered daily throughout the Russo-Japanese War of 1904-5. The name Seirogan was widely used as the academic term by army doctors for about a 4-year span.

But this was in the days when drug use as preventive medicine was not a widely embraced concept, and soldiers resisted swallowing this weird-smelling and unfamiliar pill, even when so instructed. The top brass decided to invoke the name of Emperor Meiji, telling the men that taking the pill was "according to the wishes of His Imperial Majesty". This subterfuge reportedly greatly improved the soldiers' compliance towards taking the pill, making them less prone to be forced out of action due to stomach aches or diarrhea. The army doctors were however disappointed to find that the pill did not show any of the desired combative effect towards the (non-existent) beriberi microbe. The army insisted on feeding their men pure white rice to boost morale, but that led to vitamin-deficient diet, so that one in three men serving the Russo-Japanese War were afflicted by beriberi, and 27,800 succumbed to it.

While Seirogan proved powerless against beriberi, the antidiarrheal and toothache-soothing properties of the pill were passed on, in somewhat exaggerated fashion, by repatriated war veterans. Amid the mood of victory in war, Seirogan's name became "the cure-all that defeated Russia" and many drug-makers rushed to manufacture the pill, which became a national medicine unique to Japan.

The reputation for the pill's effectiveness also spread within areas under Japanese control before the end of World War II, and Seirogan is said to be one of the popular items purchased by travelers from Taiwan, Hong Kong, the People's Republic of China, and other Asian countries.

The pill ceased to be part of regular military issue supplies in 1906, but the military continued to keep itself constantly supplied for use. In 2007, it was part of the supply kit issued to the SDF during the UN Mission in Nepal.

After the war with Russia, and again after World War II, administrative guidance was issued against the use of the kanji character  as being undesirable from the standpoint of international relations. Taiko Pharmaceutical made the change in 1949. But one manufacturer  still uses the old written form that reads "conquer".

Intellectual property rights dispute

Taiko's trademark registration and Izumi's lawsuit to revoke trademark 
In 1946,  the leading manufacturer of the pill, had obtained through formal negotiation with Saichi Nakajima the right to continue selling his "Chūyū Seirogan" pill. Accordingly, in 1954, Taiko made a claim for the exclusive use of the "Seirogan" name, and filed for trademark registration.

The group petitioned the Patent Office in April 1955 to revoke the trademark. It was not until April 1960, that the Patent Office handed down its decision to maintain the registered trademark. So the group filed a suit in the Tokyo High Court, which in September 1971, ruled that "The seirongan is recognized by the nation's populace as a common name for bowels-regulating agents that use creosote as main ingredient, and [the court hereby] rules to void the Patent Office's decision to make it a proprietary trademark". This ruling was upheld by the Supreme Court of Japan, thus finalizing the decision in March 1974.

However, the Seirogan registered trademark is still retained by Taiko Pharmaceutical (Trademark Registration No. 545984).  It is not clear why the registered trademark remains unexpunged despite the supreme court ruling, but a trademark registration does not vanish automatically, and needs to go through a Patent Office review process. The Patent Office may have surmised that the Court's ruling effectively accomplished the purpose or remedy sought by the petitioners, obviating the need for another review. The Court's opinion made it expressly clear that the name Seirogan had passed into a common noun, which meant that the trademark privileges (proprietary rights) upon it was not protected or enforceable pursuant to Japan's Trademark Act, Article 26, Paragraph 2.

Thus companies other than Taiko are allowed to sell the drug under the "Seirogan" name, without this constituting an infringement of trademark. Taiko's attempted litigation in 2005-8 (described) also failed to establish its proprietary rights. But the Court's opinion curiously left open a leeway, allowing for possible future reversal depending on the shift in popular convention. Seirogan is one of few pharmaceutical drugs names thus given public domain status, aspirin being another immediately called to mind.

Taiko's petition for an injunction against unfair competitive practices 
On July 27, 2006, The Osaka District Court ruled against the plaintiff saying a distinction can be made between the bugle and calabash logos. Taiko then appealed on August 7, but the Osaka High Court upheld the decision, and the Supreme Court's second  rejected against hearing the case on July 4, 2008, which finalized Taiko's loss in this lawsuit.

But in the opinion read by the court contained this passage: "Whether a certain label is a common name or not is an issue pertaining to perception by users (commercial dealers and consumers at large), so even if a label has been regarded as a common name within a certain period, it may later come to be perceived as denoting a specific product as a matter of the ongoing real situation of its commerce, and it is not impossible for it to regain its  (i.e., manufacturer specifying) purpose".

Misinformed drug risk accusation controversy 

The primary active ingredient used in seirogan is wood-tar creosote. In addition, "a long-term safety study in rats documented a lack of oncogenicity for wood creosote"  The second supplement then defined the coal-derivative  as a separate commodity (containing carcinogenic substances such as Benzo(a)pyrene, a Polycyclic aromatic hydrocarbon). The  wood-tar creosote is commonly called "Nikkyoku creosote" (i.e. Japanese pharmacopoeial creosote) as a means to distinguish from potentially harmful industrial creosote.

These recent naming conventions were prompted by a controversy set off by a consumer alert booklet,  (pub. 1999) that anthologized a series run in the magazine . The booklet accused seirogan of its dangers, based on the mistaken notion that the wood-tar creosote and the industrial creosote oil were identical commodities.

Notes

References 

, pp. 130-. An illustrated page 134 shows 20 different seirogan brand boxes.
, p. 188-, describes an attempt to market seirogan as a supplement in the US.

External links 
 Taikō Pharmaceuticals homepage.
research papers bibliography
 Seirogan (USA) official Website
 Izumi Yakuhin Kogyou homepage.

Drugs in Japan
Antidiarrhoeals
Trademarks